This is a list of notable people who were born or have lived in Tambov, Tambov Oblast, Russia.

Born in Tambov

18th century

1701–1800 
 Alexander Bezobrazov (1783–1871), Russian statesman
 Nikolay Gamalei (1795–1859), Russian statesman, Vitebsk governor, served in the Ministry of Internal Affairs

19th century

1801–1900 
 Boris Chicherin (1828–1904), Russian jurist and political philosopher
 Nikolai Fyodorov (1829–1903), Russian Orthodox Christian philosopher, who was part of the Russian cosmism movement and a precursor of transhumanism
 Ivan Minayev (1840–1890), the first Russian Indologist
 Constantin Fahlberg (1850–1910), Russian chemist
 Nikita Galakhov (1864–1912), inventor of the elliptical springs for the railroad carriages
 Vladimir Shchuko (1878–1939), Russian architect
 Nikolai Cholodny (1882–1953), Soviet influential microbiologist
 Vasily Agapkin (1884–1964), Russian and Soviet military orchestra conductor, composer, and author of the well-known march "Farewell of Slavianka" (written 1912)
 Maria Spiridonova (1884–1941), Russian socialist revolutionary
 Alexey Selezniev (1888–1967), Russian chess master and chess composer
 Vasili Vanin (1898–1951), Russian stage and film actor of the Soviet era
 Lev Kuleshov (1899–1970), Russian and Soviet filmmaker and film theorist

20th century

1901–1920 
 Zoia Gaidai (1902–1965), Soviet Ukrainian opera soprano
 Andrey Kolmogorov (1903–1987), Russian mathematician
 Vera Faddeeva (1906–1983), Russian mathematician
 Valentin Avrorin (1907–1977), Member of the Academy of Sciences of the USSR
 Ida Kar (1908–1974), photographer
 Ivan Dzerzhinsky (1909–1978), Russian composer
 Olga Ivinskaya (1912–1995), Russian poet and writer
 Valery Zhelobinsky (1913–1946), Russian composer and pianist
 Vladimir Svetilko (1915–1995), Russian lightweight weightlifter
 Victor Merzhanov (1919–2012), Russian pianist

1921–1950 
 Vladimir Teplyakov (1925–2009), Russian experimental physicist
 Victoria Barbă (1926–2020), Moldovan animated film director
 Vladimir Bolotin (1926–2008), Russian Mechanical engineer
 Vitaly Galkov (1939–1998), Soviet-born Russian sprint canoer
 Aleksandr Dokhlyakov (born 1942), Soviet cyclist
 Svetlana Babanina (born 1943), Soviet swimmer
 Yury Chernavsky (born 1947), Russian producer, composer and songwriter
 Oleg Betin (born 1950), Russian politician; governor of Tambov Oblast

1951–1980 
 Victor Krylov (born 1952), Russian-born British academic
 Ludmila Engquist (Narozhilenko; born 1964), Soviet/Russian/Swedish athlete; champion sprinter
 Svetlana Nageykina (born 1965), Soviet/Russian cross-country skier
 Aleksandr Khalzov (born 1965), Russian professional footballer
 Sergey Kuznetsov (born 1966), Russian professional football coach and a former player
 Alexei Kovalev (born 1973), Russian football referee
 Aleksandr Malin (born 1973), Russian professional football coach and a former player
 Ruslan Sviridov (born 1973), Russian classical pianist, pedagogue
 Aleksandr Kudryashov (born 1974), Russian professional footballer
 Igor Neuchev (born 1974), Russian professional footballer
 Kyrylo Pospyeyev (born 1975), Ukrainian former professional cyclist
 Yekaterina Nesterenko (born 1976), Russian alpine skier
 Vladislav Frolov (born 1980), Russian sprint athlete

1981–2000 
 Sergei Lebedkov (born 1981), Russian professional football player
 Anastasia Rodionova (born 1982), Russian-born Australian professional tennis player
 Aleksey Mikhalyov (born 1983), Russian professional football player
 Yuri Zhirkov (born 1983), Russian footballer
 Bella Igla (born 1985), Israeli female chess player
 Viktor Tolstykh (born 1985), Russian professional football player
 Arina Rodionova (born 1989), Russian-born Australian professional tennis player

Born in Tambov Governorate

18th century

1701–1800 
 Nikolai Arkharov (1742–1814), Russian statesman
 Afanasy Grigoriev (1782–1868), Russian Neoclassical architect, took part in the reconstruction of Moscow after the War 1812
 Paisi Kaysarov (1783–1844), Russian general who served during the Napoleonic Wars
 Yevgeny Baratynsky (1800–1844), Russian poet

19th century

1801–1850 
 Natalia Goncharova (1812–1863), A. S. Pushkin's wife. She was born in the village Karian-Zagryazhskoye of the Tambov province.
 Andrei Karelin (1837–1906), Russian artist, photographer of the Academy of Arts
 Alexander Lodygin (1847–1923), one of the founders of the electrothermy, author of almost 400 inventions including a tungsten filament lamp. He was born in the village of Stenshino of the Tambov province.
 Flavian Flavitsky (1848–1917), Russian chemist
 Yevgeny Lanceray (1848–1886), well-known Russian sculptor

1851–1900 
 Maksim Dmitriyev (1858–1948), Russian photographer
 Vladimir Arnoldi (1871–1924), Russian botanist
 Konstantin Igumnov (1873–1948), Russian pianist-virtuoso, professor of Moscow Conservatory
 Anastasius (Gribanovsky) (1873–1965), hierarch of the Russian Orthodox Church and the second First Hierarch of the Russian Orthodox Church Outside Russia
 Benjamin (Fedchenkov) (1880–1961), Bishop of the Russian Church, Orthodox missionary and writer
 Lev Ilyin (1880–1942), Russian architect, in 1925–1938 the main architect of Leningrad
 Aleksandr Gerasimov (1881–1963), Soviet painter
 Sergei Brukhonenko (1890–1960), Russian physician
 Nikolay Annenkov (Kokin) (1899–1999), patriarch of the Moscow Maly Theatre

20th century

1901–1937 
 Yevgeny Krinov (1906–1984), Soviet Russian astronomer and geologist
 Igor Levkoev (1909–1978), Russian chemist-photographer
 Alexei T. Sergeev (1919–1998), bass singer; one of the Alexandrov Ensemble soloists, People's Artist of the USSR
 Nikolay Basov (1922–2001), Soviet physicist and educator
 Vsevolod Bobrov (1922–1979), Soviet Russian athlete, who excelled in football, bandy and ice hockey
 Zoya Kosmodemyanskaya (1923–1941), Soviet partisan and Hero of the Soviet Union
 Sergei Filatov (1926–1997), Olympic equestrian champion
 Ivan Kalita (1927–1996), Soviet equestrian and Olympic champion

Born in Tambov Oblast

1938–2000 
 Igor Uporov (born 1965), Russian advocate
 Alexandr Potapov (born 1985), most popular designer and producer

Lived in Tambov 
 Matvei Bashkin (16th century), Russian boyar's son, the first martyr of the Russian Molokan faith
 Roman Boborykin (17th century), Russian statesman
 Feofil (Rayev) (1738–1811), Bishop of Tambov
 Gavrila Derzhavin (1743–1816), Russian poet
 Michael Lunin (1787–1845), Russian political philosopher, revolutionary, Mason, Decembrist
 Mikhail Lermontov (1814–1841), well-known Russian poet
 Theophan the Recluse (Georgy Govorov; 1815–1894), Bishop of Tambov; saint in the Russian Orthodox Church
 Aleksey Zhemchuzhnikov (1821–1908), Russian poet, dramatist, essayist and literary critic
 Ivan Vladimirovich Michurin (1855–1935), plant breeder
 Maxim Gorky (Alexei Peshkov) (1868–1936), Russian and Soviet writer and public figure, a founder of socialist realism literature
 Luka (Voyno-Yasenetsky) (1877–1961), Doctor of Medicine and surgeon
 David Burliuk (1882–1967), Russian poet and painter
 Alexander Antonov (1888–1922), leader of the Tambov peasant revolt (1920–1921)
 Konstantin Fedin (1892–1977), Russian writer
 Leonid Dyomin (1897–1973), Doctor of Geographical Sciences, professor
 Alexander Levshin (1899–1982), producer
 Fiodor Dubovitsky (1907–1999), Doctor of Chemical Sciences, professor
 Lev Dyomin (1926–1998), Russian cosmonaut
 Yury Artyukhin (1930–1998), Soviet Russian cosmonaut and engineer
 Nikolay Bochkov (1931–2011), Russian scientist

See also 

 List of Russian people
 List of Russian-language poets

Tambov
Tambov